Venkatraopally is a village in Bheemaram mandal, Jagtial district.

Venkatraopet village is surrounded by Kacharam, Rangapur, Bheemaram, Kammaripet, Ragojipet, Oddayd and Ogulapur villages. Venkatraopet is a major village for surrounding villages, major town is Jagityal it just 16 km or 30 min away..It is a major villages for the surrounding villages and all the farmers live together in village and different kind of religions people living in the village are live with unity. In venkatraopet 1600 people are living in that 900 are women and 700 are men.It is a beautiful village with greenary and peaceful environment.

Villages in Jagtial district